Lordly Domains is a 1997 role-playing game supplement published by Chaosium for Pendragon.

Contents
Lordly Domains is a sourcebook about nobles and their lives.

Reviews
Dragon #247
Valkyrie #15 (1997)
Backstab #4
Backstab #7 (French version)
Envoyer (German) (Issue 50 - Dec 2000)

References

Fantasy role-playing game supplements
Pendragon (role-playing game)
Role-playing game supplements introduced in 1997